North Fork Township is one of ten townships in Gallatin County, Illinois, USA.  As of the 2010 census, its population was 408 and it contained 204 housing units.

Geography

Cities, towns, villages
 Ridgway (west quarter)

Unincorporated towns
 Elba at 
(This list is based on USGS data and may include former settlements.)

Cemeteries
The township contains these six cemeteries: Campground, Garrett, Oak Grove Church, Saint Josephs, Union Chapel and Zion.

Major highways
  Illinois Route 1

Demographics

School districts
 Eldorado Community Unit School District 4
 Gallatin Community Unit School District 7

Political districts
 Illinois' 19th congressional district
 State House District 118
 State Senate District 59

References
 
 United States Census Bureau 2007 TIGER/Line Shapefiles
 United States National Atlas

External links
 City-Data.com
 Illinois State Archives

Townships in Gallatin County, Illinois
Townships in Illinois